Lamy of Santa Fe is a 1975 biography of Catholic Archbishop Jean Baptiste Lamy, written by American author Paul Horgan and published by Farrar, Straus and Giroux. The book won the 1976 Pulitzer Prize for History.

References 

1975 non-fiction books
History books about the United States
Pulitzer Prize for History-winning works
Farrar, Straus and Giroux books